Michele Cooke is an American geoscientist and professor at the University of Massachusetts Amherst. Cooke is known for her research on earthquakes, as well as her activism in support of other deaf and hard-of-hearing scientists.

Education 
Cooke earned her PhD at Stanford University in 1996.

Career

Research 
Cooke is a professor in the department of geosciences at the University of Massachusetts Amherst; she has worked at UMass since 2004. She researches earthquakes, fracture mechanics, and fault growth. Cooke is often quoted in (and occasionally writes) articles about earthquakes and faults.

Activism 
Cooke is partially deaf and advocates for better accessibility for other deaf scientists. After receiving an award from UMass, she gave a speech about deaf gain, which describes the benefits or values of being deaf or hard-of-hearing. Cooke also launched a blog for deaf and hard-of-hearing academics.

Honors and awards 

 Outstanding Achievement Award, College of Natural Science, UMass Amherst
 2020 Inclusive Geoscience Education and Research (IGER) Award, International Association for Geoscience Diversity

References 

Scientists with disabilities
21st-century American women scientists
American geophysicists
Women geophysicists
University of Massachusetts Amherst faculty
Stanford University alumni
American women geologists
Year of birth missing (living people)
Living people
American women academics